Ryan Saranich is an American jazz fusion saxophonist. Aside from being a saxophonist, he is also a drummer, bassist, and pianist.

Education
Previously, Ryan had attended Northwest School of the Arts, in Charlotte, North Carolina from 2001 to 2005 and also the University of North Carolina at Wilmington from 2005 to 2010. He is now attending the prestigious Berklee College of Music on scholarship.

Performances
In addition, Ryan has performed soundtracks for internationally released major motion pictures and documentaries. He currently travels as a clinician for P Mauriat Saxophones, Légère Reeds and Theo Wanne Classic Mouthpieces, as well as spending time with his group, "Ryan Saranich/Alex Bailey Project". Ryan is also an active writer and arranger, primarily in the jazz and pop settings.

Solo recordings
Ryan released his first album, "Doc's Blues" on April 28, 2008 with the help of keyboardist Joseph Wooten, drummer Nate Morton, and Brazilian musicians Raphael Du Valle (bass) and Ronaldo Pizzi (keyboards). His second work was released December 21, 2010. It is entitled, "All By Myself" where all instruments are played by him. His most current release, "Story" was released March 28, 2013.

Endorsements
Ryan plays Légère Reeds, P. Mauriat Saxophones, Theo Wanne Classic Mouthpieces, Curt Mangan Strings, Neotech Straps, Intellitouch Tuners, Soultone Cymbals and Mono Cases.

Discography
Solo

 Doc's Blues (2008)
 All By Myself (2010)
"Story" (2013)

Maurice Williams and the Zodiacs

 Carolina's Best, Volume III (2009)

Raphael Du Valle

 Cada Dia Mais (2009)

Chris Heaven

 Pure Chocolate (2008)

Georgia English

"In the Fog" (2012)

References

External links
Official website
Myspace page

1987 births
Living people